Alexandro Alves do Nascimento (30 December 1974 – 14 November 2012) was a Brazilian professional footballer who played as a striker. He played in Brazil for Vitória, Palmeiras, Juventude (RS), Portuguesa (SP), Cruzeiro, Atlético Mineiro, Vasco da Gama, Boavista (RJ), Fortaleza, Chinese side Shenyang Ginde, in Germany for Hertha BSC, and in Greece for Kavala.

Goal of the year
Alex Alves scored the Goal of the Year in Germany in 2000, scoring from inside the centre circle playing for Hertha BSC against 1. FC Köln. His goal reduced the deficit to 2–1, and Hertha won the match 4–2.

Death
Alex Alves died on 14 November 2012 in Jaú, São Paulo, after facing a battle against leukaemia.

Honours
Hertha BSC
DFL-Ligapokal: 2001, 2002

References

External links
 
 Alex Alves at playmakerstats.com (English version of ogol.com.br)

1974 births
2012 deaths
Sportspeople from Bahia
Association football forwards
Brazilian footballers
Esporte Clube Vitória players
Sociedade Esportiva Palmeiras players
Esporte Clube Juventude players
Associação Portuguesa de Desportos players
Cruzeiro Esporte Clube players
Hertha BSC players
Clube Atlético Mineiro players
CR Vasco da Gama players
Changsha Ginde players
Fortaleza Esporte Clube players
Kavala F.C. players
União Esporte Clube players
Campeonato Brasileiro Série A players
Chinese Super League players
Bundesliga players
Brazilian expatriate footballers
Brazilian expatriate sportspeople in Germany
Expatriate footballers in Germany
Brazilian expatriate sportspeople in China
Expatriate footballers in China
Brazilian expatriate sportspeople in Greece
Expatriate footballers in Greece
Deaths from leukemia
Deaths from cancer in São Paulo (state)